The Binghamton Tiger Cats played their sixth season overall and fourth as a member of the Women's Spring Football League (WSFL) in 2014. The Tiger Cats Women's Tackle Football team based in Binghamton, New York began play for its inaugural 2009 season as a member of the Women's Football Alliance and for the 2010 season as a member of the Independent Women's Football League. The Tiger Cats competed as an independent team in 2011. The Tiger Cats completed the 2013 season as the WSFL Northeast Division Champions in the 8 man division and were also a WSFL National Championship Runner-Up.

The Tiger Cats are the first women's football team representing Binghamton and the Southern Tier, NY & Northern Pennsylvania region, preceding the WFA's Southern Tier Spitfire(Defunct) by one season. The Spitfire ceased operations after only one (2010) season. The Tiger Cats are the longest operating Women's football team in the history of Upstate New York & Northern Pennsylvania. The team is also the 2nd longest operating team in all of New York State with only the Brooklyn-based NY Sharks being in existence longer.

Home games for the 2009 season were played at the Greater Binghamton Sports Complex, making the Tiger Cats the first women's football team ever to have an indoor venue.  For the 2010 IWFL season and the 2011 Independent season the Tiger Cats played at Binghamton Alumni Stadium. During the 2012,2013,2014 WSFL seasons the Tiger Cats played their Home games at the Endless Mountains Sports Complex in Towanda, Pennsylvania which is widely regarded as the best facility in 8-man football. The Tiger Cats hosted the 2012 WSFL's Inaugural 8 & 11 man divisions National Championship Games on August 11, 2012, also at Endless Mountains Stadium.

In their last regular season game of 2012 the Tiger Cats traveled to Portland, Maine and defeated the Maine Rebels by a score of 22-8 thus becoming the first team in WSFL history to defeat a team from the elite, long standing Independent Women's Football League (IWFL).

The team is presumably named after Canadian football's Hamilton Tiger-Cats, with likely inspiration from Binghamton University, whose sports teams are named the "Bearcats." The Lady Ti-Cats use a black and red winged football helmet similar to college football's Michigan Wolverines.

Season-By-Season

|-
| colspan="6" align="center" | Binghamton Tiger Cats (WFA)
|-
|2009 || 2 || 6 || 0 || 5th National Northeast || --
|-
| colspan="6" align="center" | Binghamton Tiger Cats (IWFL2)
|-
|2010 || 0 || 8 || 0 || 8th Eastern Northeast || --
|-
| colspan="6" align="center" | Binghamton Tiger Cats (Independent)
|-
|2011 || 6 || 4 || 0 || -- || --
|-
| colspan="6" align="center" | Binghamton Tiger Cats (WSFL)
|-
|2012 || 4 || 4 || 0 || 3rd American Northeast || --
|-
| colspan="6" align="center" | Binghamton Tiger Cats (W8FL)
|-
|2013 || 4 || 2 || 0 || 2nd League || Lost W8FL Championship (West Virginia)
|-
|2014 || 2 || 4 || 0 || 3rd League || Lost League Semifinal (West Virginia)
|-
!Totals || 18 || 28 || 0 
|colspan="2"|

Roster

Season schedules

2009

** = Won by forfeit

2010

2011

2012 schedule

References

External links
 

Women's Spring Football League teams
Sports in Binghamton, New York
American football teams in New York (state)
American football teams established in 2008
2008 establishments in New York (state)
Bradford County, Pennsylvania
Women's sports in New York (state)